These are the official results of the Women's 100 metres Hurdles event at the 1987 IAAF World Championships in Rome, Italy. There were a total number of 26 participating athletes, with four qualifying heats, two semi-finals and the final held on Friday September 4, 1987.

Medalists

Final

Semi-finals
Held on Friday 1987-09-04

Qualifying heats
Held on Thursday 1987-09-03

References
 Results

H
Sprint hurdles at the World Athletics Championships
1987 in women's athletics